Pierre Rolland may refer to:

Pierre Rolland (chef), Michelin starred head chef of The Russell Hotel
Pierre Rolland (cyclist) (born 1986), French professional road bicycle racer
Pierre Rolland (military officer) (1772–1848), French brigadier general 
Pierre Rolland (musician) (born 1931), Canadian oboe and English horn player, radio broadcaster, music critic, music educator, and arts administrator
Pierre-Jacques-Nicolas Rolland (1769–1837), French naval engineer

See also
Pierre Roland, Indonesian actor